The 2001 FIBA Under-19 World Championship for Women (Czech: Mistrovství světa FIBA žen do 19 let 2001)took place in the Czech Republic from 14 to 22 July 2001. It was co-organised by the International Basketball Federation (FIBA) and Czech Basketball Federation.

Twelve national teams competed for the championship. Czech Republic came away with the Gold medal by defeating Russia 82–80 in the final.

Venues
Brno

Competing nations
Except Czech Republic, which automatically qualified as the host nation, the 11 remaining countries qualified through their continents’ qualifying tournaments:

FIBA Africa (1)
 
FIBA Americas (3)
 
 
 

FIBA Asia (2)
 
 
FIBA Oceania (1)
 

FIBA Europe (4+1)
  (Hosts)

Final standings

Awards

References

External links
 Official website of 2001 FIBA World Championship for Junior Women.

2001
2001–02 in Czech basketball
2001 in women's basketball
International women's basketball competitions hosted by the Czech Republic
2001
2001 in youth sport